Catherine Kay Blumetta [Swish] (May 1, 1923 – April 25, 1997) was a utility who played for six different clubs in the All-American Girls Professional Baseball League between the  and  seasons.
  
Born in North Plainfield, New Jersey, Blumetta was a solid and dependable player who appeared in eleven out of twelve seasons of the All-American Girls Professional Baseball League. She entered the league in 1944 with the expansion Minneapolis Millerettes, playing for them briefly before joining the Milwaukee Chicks during the midseason. She divided her playing time at first base and outfield, and was a member of the Milwaukee team that won the pennant that year. But she moved around for a while, as the AAGPBL shifted players as needed to help teams stay afloat.

In 1945 Blumetta played for the Grand Rapids Chicks and then found herself on the move again, this time to the Peoria Redwings (1946–1947), and then the Fort Wayne Daisies (1947–1950), before landing with the Kalamazoo Lassies for the rest of her career (1951–1954). She began pitching sidearm in 1946, until overhand pitching became effective in 1948 through the final season in 1954.

In 1948, Blumetta enjoyed her most productive season as a pitcher when she posted a 14–13 record with Fort Wayne. Often used as a pinch-hitter when she was not pitching, she also was used in the outfield for defensive purposes. In addition, she was a member of the 1954 Champions Lassies, during what turned out to be the league's final season.

Since 1988, Blumetta and the other AAGPBL players form part of the permanent display at the Baseball Hall of Fame and Museum at Cooperstown, New York, which is dedicated to the entire league rather than any individual player.

Blumetta died in her hometown of North Plainfield, New Jersey, at the age of 73.

Sources

All-American Girls Professional Baseball League players
Minneapolis Millerettes players
Milwaukee Chicks players
Grand Rapids Chicks players
Peoria Redwings players
Fort Wayne Daisies players
Kalamazoo Lassies players
Baseball players from New Jersey
People from North Plainfield, New Jersey
Sportspeople from Somerset County, New Jersey
1923 births
1997 deaths
20th-century American women
20th-century American people